Sankrail Assembly constituency is an assembly constituency in Howrah district in the Indian state of West Bengal. It is reserved for scheduled castes.

Overview
As per orders of the Delimitation Commission, No. 174 Sankrail Assembly constituency  (SC) is composed of the following: Andul, Banpur I, Banpur II, Dakshin Sankrail, Dhulagari, Kandua, Manikpur, Mashila, Nalpur, Raghudebbati, Sankrail, Sarenga gram panchayats of Sankrail community development block and Kolora I, Kolora II, Mahiyari I, Mahiyari II gram panchayats of Domjur community development block.

Sankrail Assembly constituency is part of No. 25 Howrah (Lok Sabha constituency).

Members of Legislative Assembly

Election results

2021

2016

2011

 

.# Swing calculated on Congress+Trinamool Congress vote percentages taken together in 2006.

1977-2006
In the 2006, 2001 1996 state assembly elections, Sital Kumar Sardar of Trinamool Congress / Congress won the 169 Sankrail (SC) assembly seat, defeating his nearest rivals Anirban Hazara of CPI(M).Bikash Mondal of CPI(M) in 2001 and Basudeb Dhali of CPI(M) in 1996. Contests in most years were multi cornered but only winners and runners are being mentioned. Haran Hazra of CPI(M) defeated Nityananda Bhuniya of Congress/ Janata Party in 1991, 1987, 1982 and 1977.

1951-1972
Haran Hazra of CPI(M) won in 1972, 1971 and 1969. N.N.Bhuniya of Congress won in 1967. Dulal Chandra Mondal of CPI won in 1962. In 1957 and 1951 Sankrail had joint seats. Shyama Prasanna Bhattacharya of CPI and Apurbalal Mazumdar of Forward Bloc (Marxist) won in 1957. Kanai Lal Bhattacharya and Kripa Sindhu Shaw, both of Forward Bloc (Ruiker), won in 1951.

References

Assembly constituencies of West Bengal
Politics of Howrah district
1952 establishments in West Bengal
Constituencies established in 1952